Watson is a town of 777 residents in the rural municipality of Lakeside, in the Canadian province of Saskatchewan. Watson is located on the intersection of Highway 5 and Highway 6, the Canam Highway. Watson is approximately the same distance from Saskatoon which is to the west, and Regina to the south, which gives rise to its town motto, Industrial Crossroads of Saskatchewan.

History
Settlers began arriving in the early 1900s, many of them German American Catholics. The first post office in the area was established on April 1, 1904 and named Vossen after its postmaster, Frank J. Vossen Jr. It was changed to Watson on May 1, 1906, in advance of the village's incorporation on October 6, 1906. The village became a town on August 1, 1908. The town's namesake is Senator Robert Watson.  Senator Watson, originally owned the land the town was built on. Watson celebrated its first Santa Claus Day in 1932, and in 1996 erected a -high Santa Claus to commemorate the event.

Demographics 

Geography
Jansen Lake, Houghton Lake, Lenore Lake, Ironspring Creek, Big Quill Lake and Little Quill Lake are all close to Watson.

Transportation
The town is located at the junction of Saskatchewan Highway 5 and Saskatchewan Highway 6.

Railway
Melfort Subdivision  C.P.R—serves Lanigan, Leroy, Watson, Spalding

Margo Subdivision Canadian National Railway

Notable people
Dustin Tokarski – NHL Goaltender
Ross Lonsberry – NHL Player
Max McNab – NHL Player, Coach, GM
Rod Gantefoer – Legislative Assembly of Saskatchewan MLA, Finance

References

External links

Towns in Saskatchewan
Lakeside No. 338, Saskatchewan
Division No. 10, Saskatchewan